The Savoia-Marchetti SM.83 was an Italian civil airliner of the 1930s.  It was a civilian version of the Savoia-Marchetti SM.79 bomber.

Design and development
It was a monoplane, with retractable undercarriage, and a slim fuselage. Though the cabin was provided with heaters, oxygen provision and sound insulation it was large enough for the 4 crew and only four to 10 passengers. The construction was of mixed materials in the typical Savoia-Marchetti style of the time: steel tubes for the fuselage, wood for the wings, and the outer skin made up of wood, fabric or metal. The wings had slats. The powerplant was three AR.126 engines giving a total of about 2,300 hp.

The maximum speed was slightly better than the bomber  at  due to the absence of the gondola and hump machine gun positions.

First flying on 19 November 1937, it entered into production for LATI, SABENA and other companies, but it had less success compared to the more economic and capable 18 seater Savoia-Marchetti S.73 even if had much improved performance. As a result, only 23 were built in two main series.

Service
When war broke out, the Italian aircraft were impressed into the Regia Aeronautica, and used in transport units.

One S.83 was used near the end of the war to flee Italy. Spain had forbidden aircraft both military and civilian of the Axis powers from landing there so S.83 was painted with Croatian insignia and purportedly owned by a Croatian citizen. Carrying 5,000 litres of fuel (50% more than standard) and 14 men and women including the parents of Claretta Petacci, Benito Mussolini’s mistress), the aircraft took off at 4:30 on 23 April 1945 from Milan. It landed at Barcelona just three hours later. It was not until September that the crew and aircraft were repatriated.

Operators

Civil operators
 
 SABENA - four aircraft (three delivered)
 
 Ala Littoria
 LATI
 
 LARES - three aircraft
 Prince Bibesco of Romania - one aircraft

Military operators
 
 Belgian Air Force
 
 Regia Aeronautica
 
 Royal Romanian Air Force

Specifications (S.83)

See also

Notes

References 

SM.083
1930s Italian airliners
World War II Italian transport aircraft
Trimotors
Low-wing aircraft
Aircraft first flown in 1937